The First Street Bridge in Napa, California carries First Street over the Napa River. It was built in 1914 and was listed on the National Register of Historic Places in 2004.

It is a reinforced concrete bridge with three spans.

The bridge was designed by the engineering firm of Leonard and Day, whose senior partner, John B. Leonard "was perhaps the state's most important designer of concrete bridges in the first two decades of the last century."

It was built by contractor C. H. Gildersleeve.

It is structurally a concrete girder bridge although it has the picturesque appearance of a Luten arch bridge.

See also
List of bridges documented by the Historic American Engineering Record in California

References

External links

Concrete girder bridges
Bridges in California
Historic American Engineering Record in California
National Register of Historic Places in Napa County, California
Buildings and structures completed in 1914